AZ Heimstaden Havířov is an ice hockey team in the Czech Second Hockey League (third-tier league) from Havířov.

The city of Havířov was established in 1955. However the beginnings of ice hockey in surrounding villages date back to 1928, when workers began to skate on local ponds after their shift. The hockey club was registered in 1931 as KČT Lazy, named after the Lazy Coal Mine. In 1966 the club moved to Havířov and was given the name AZ Havířov after Antonín Zápotocký Coal Mine. In 1992 the club was promoted to the second level league.

In 1999 the club bought the Extraliga license from Slezan Opava. In the 2002/2003 season Havířov lost the relegation play-off against HC Kladno and was relegated to the First National Hockey League. Since that time the club was constantly haunted by the financial problems. Finally, in January 2010 the club announced insolvency and the remaining games were lost by forfeit. According to the ice hockey federation rules, the club is automatically relegated to the lower division, i.e. the Second National Hockey League.

In 2022, Havířov relegated to Czech 2. liga.

Team names 
Source: 

 1931–1948: KČT Lazy (Czech Tourists Club Lazy)
 1948–1953: Sokol Lazy
 1953–late 1950s: DSO Baník Zápotocký (Voluntary sports organization Baník Zápotocký)
 late 1950s–1966: TJ Důl AZ (Physical education unit Antonín Zápotocký Mine)
 1966–1993: TJ AZ Havířov (Physical education unit AZ Havířov)
 1993–1999: HC Havířov
 1999–2001: HC Femax Havířov
 2001–2010: HC Havířov Panthers
 2010–2017: HC AZ Havířov 2010
 2017–2020: AZ Residomo Havířov
 2020–present: AZ Heimstaden Havířov

Season-by-season record

Czechoslovakia 
Source:

Czech Republic 
Source:

References

External links 
  Official website
  AZ Fans: Official fans website

Havířov 
Sport in Havířov
1928 establishments in Czechoslovakia
Ice hockey clubs established in 1928